Beryllium poisoning is poisoning by the toxic effects of beryllium, or more usually its compounds. It takes two forms:

 Acute beryllium poisoning, usually as a result of exposure to soluble beryllium salts
 Chronic beryllium disease (CBD) or berylliosis, usually as a result of long-term exposure to beryllium oxide usually caused by inhalation.

Poisoning
Toxic effects of metals